Lehman High School may refer to:

Lehman Catholic High School, Sidney, Ohio
Lehman High School (Canton, Ohio)
Lehman High School (Texas)
Lake-Lehman Jr. Sr. High, Luzerne County, Pennsylvania
Herbert H. Lehman High School, Bronx, New York
High School of American Studies at Lehman College, Bronx, New York

See also 
Lehman (disambiguation)